Haridaspur is a village near Aligarh in Uttar Pradesh, India. It is also known by the name Khair wali Sarak. The name "Haridaspur" was given in honour of Swami Haridas, who was born in this village.

Haridaspur is 20 km from Khair and 3 km from Aligarh. The village is situated on Khair Road

Villages in Aligarh district